Late Autumn may refer to:
Dry season
 
Late Autumn (1960 film), a Japanese drama film by Yasujirō Ozu
 Late Autumn (만추, 晩秋)
Late Autumn (1966 film), a Korean film starring Shin Seong-il
Late Autumn (1982 film), a Korean film starring Kim Hye-ja
Late Autumn (2010 film), a Korean film starring Tang Wei and Hyun Bin